Oflag X-C was a German World War II prisoner-of-war camp for officers (Offizierlager) in Lübeck in northern Germany. The camp was located on the corner of Friedhofsallee and Vorwerkstrasse, close to Lübeck's border with the town of Schwartau (now Bad Schwartau), and is often cited as being located in Schwartau rather than Lübeck.

Camp history 
The camp was opened in June 1940 for French officers captured during the Battle of France. In June 1941 British and Commonwealth officers from the Battle of Crete and the North African Campaign arrived. During 1941 and 1942 many Allied air crews that had been shot down were taken to Lübeck, then later transferred to Oflag VI-B, Warburg In early 1945 Polish Officers, inmates of Oflag II-D Gross-Born and Oflag II-C Woldenberg, were marched westwards and finally reached Oflag X-C. The camp was liberated on 2 May 1945 by troops of the British 2nd Army. Prisoners of war were repatriated during May 1945 (Operation Exodus).

Prominent prisoners 
French theologian Yves Congar was placed as a POW at the Lübeck fortress because of his numerous escape attempts from other camps after being captured while serving as an officer in the French army.

See also
List of prisoner-of-war camps in Germany
Oflag
Operation Exodus (WWII operation)

References 
Notes

Bibliography
 
 
 Rollings, Charles (August 2004), Wire and Worse: RAF Prisoners of War in Laufen, Bibarach, Lubeck and Warburg 1940-42. 

Oflags
History of Lübeck
World War II prisoner of war camps in Germany
1940 establishments in Germany
1945 disestablishments in Germany